Zein TV was a satellite TV channel started as a joint venture between Future TV and Dubai Media City. It started broadcasting in 1999 targeting Arab youth.

The main TV program was Dardachat, a daily Live program featuring a group of young people sharing their knowledge and experience in life in different topics.

External links

Arabic-language television stations